Day of Triumph is a 1954 American drama film directed by Irving Pichel and John T. Coyle, from a screenplay by Arthur T. Horman.  The film stars Lee J. Cobb, Robert Wilson, James Griffith, and Joanne Dru.

This was the last film directed by Irving Pichel, who died on July 13, 1954, five months before the film was released.

Synopsis
The film is Pichel's take on the life of Christ and focuses on the controversy and politics surrounding his life, particularly the activities of Zadok (Lee J. Cobb), leader of an anti-pagan group called the Zealots. Zadok initially plans to use Jesus (Robert Wilson) to rally support for the cause of political freedom. As he follows him, Jesus cures Mary Magdalene's mother and raises Lazarus from the dead -- acts which wear away at Zadok's skepticism, but focus significant attention on Christ.

Cast list
Lee J. Cobb as Zadok, Zealot leader
Robert Wilson as The Christ
James Griffith as Judas Iscariot
Ralph Freud as Caiaphas
Everett Glass as Annas
Tyler McVey as Peter
Lowell Gilmore as Pontius Pilate
Michael Connors as Andrew
Anthony Warde as Barabbas
Peter Whitney as Nikator
Joanne Dru as Mary Magdalene

References

External links
 

Portrayals of Jesus in film
1954 drama films
1950s English-language films
American drama films
1950s American films